Alexandre Luiz Goulart (born July 24, 1976), sometimes known as just Alexandre, is a Brazilian football player.

Alexandre Goulart appearance in two Campeonato Brasileiro matches for Sport Club Internacional. He spent several years playing football for Boavista F.C. and C.D. Nacional in the Portuguese Liga.

Club statistics

References

External links

1976 births
Living people
Brazilian footballers
Brazilian expatriate footballers
Expatriate footballers in Portugal
Expatriate footballers in Japan
Campeonato Brasileiro Série A players
J1 League players
Primeira Liga players
Cruzeiro Esporte Clube players
Shimizu S-Pulse players
Sport Club Internacional players
C.D. Nacional players
Boavista F.C. players
Association football forwards